Aftab Ahmed (31 December 1949 – 26 September 2006) was a Bangladeshi academic. He served as the 5th vice-chancellor of National University of Bangladesh. On 23 September 2006, Ahmed was assassinated at his Dhaka residence. Mofiqul Hasan Tripti, an influential politician of the Bangladesh Nationalist Party, was arrested for the crime in August 2018.

Early life
Ahmed was born at Mirzanagar of Begumganj Upazila in Noakhali District. He passed the SSC  and HSC exams in 1966 and 1968 respectively. He stood first class first in BA (honours) and master's in political science from the University of Dhaka in 1971 and 1972 respectively. He earned his PhD from the University of London in 1983.

Career
Ahmed joined the political science department of the University of Chittagong in 1977 as a lecturer and was promoted to assistant professor in 1981 and associate professor in 1984. He joined the University of Dhaka as a professor of political science department in 1995. He served as the vice-chancellor of National University of Bangladesh from July 2003 until July 2005. He was relieved from the position before completing the full 4-year tenure. He then served as a senior professor of political science at the University of Dhaka.

Death 
On 23 September 2006, three gunmen stormed Ahmed's residence at the University of Dhaka campus and shot him with several bullets. He was admitted to the Samorita Hospital and then later to the Combined Military Hospital (CMH). Three days later, Ahmed died following a cardiac arrest resulting from blood clots. In 2008, one of the four suspected accused in the murder case gave his confessional statement before a court and disclosed the name of Bangladesh Nationalist Party Member of Parliament Mofiqul Hasan Tripti in connection with the involvement in the murder. A Dhaka court rejected his bail and ordered him sent to jail on the 10-day remand prayer submitted by the Criminal Investigation Department inspector.

Personal life
Ahmed was married to Noorjahan Aftab.

References

1949 births
2006 deaths
People from Begumganj Upazila
University of Dhaka alumni
Alumni of the University of London
Academic staff of the University of Chittagong
Academic staff of the University of Dhaka
Vice-Chancellors of National University Bangladesh
Burials at Mirpur Martyred Intellectual Graveyard